Huvina Hadagali is a town in Vijayanagara district.

Historical names of Huvina Hadagali
Puvina-Posavadangile
 An inscription found on a slab set up at the western entrance into the Keshavaswami temple at Huvina Hadagali, records that "Rebbaladevi, wife of the brave Brahman general Ravideva or Raviga caused the construction of the temple of Kesavadeva in Puvina-Posavadangile, which was her birthplace and having set up the god in the temple, made grants of many plots of land for the service of the god and for maintaining a feeding house for Brahmans, a flower garden and a house for the satra, in the presence of the Brahman Mahajanas of the place".
 Puvina-Padangile
 An inscription found on a slab set in the front of the Anjaneya temple at Yenigi, Hadagali Taluk, records that "while the king (the Sevuna Yadava king Kandharadeva or Kannara (1247-1261)) was camping at the nelevidu of Devagiri, the 120 Brahman Mahajanas of Puvina-Padangile, who are described as very learned in the Vedas and the Shastras, performing Aupasana and Agnihotra and as ripukula-kadali-vana-kunjarar (as destructive to enemies as elephants to a forest of plantain-trees) and saranagata-vajra-panjarar (mail-armour to those who seek shelter under them), made a gift of various plots of land of specified boundary, for the service of the god Kusmanatha at the village." Puvina-Padangile is stated to have been "situated in the Kogali-nadu, which was the eye of the Nolambavadi-nadu which again was, as it were, the nose of Kuntala-desa".

Demographics
 India census, Huvina Hadagali had a population of 23,404. Males constitute 51% of the population and females 49%. Huvina Hadagali has an average literacy rate of 60%, higher than the national average of 59.5%: male literacy is 67%, and female literacy is 53%. In Huvina Hadagali, 14% of the population is under 6 years of age.

 Govt. Higher Primary School, Honnur.
 Gangavathi Bhagyamma Rural College and PG Center (vvsgbrcollege.com)
 Government Engineering College
 Jaycees Primary School, Mahaveer Nagar 
 JSS Public School (CBSE)
 JSS B.Ed. College
 JEMHP School {kb}
 S. R. M. P. P. Govt. First Grade College
 Bahubali Convent
 M. M. Patil School
 Thungabhadra High School
 Mount Carmel School
 Government Engineering College
 S. P. V. Govt. Model Higher Primary School
 S. V. G. Govt. Model Higher Primary School
 G. P. G. Govt. Boys High School
 G. P. G. Govt. P. U. College
 S. K. Govt. Girls High School
 T. D. V. Govt. Model Higher Primary School
 Mallige Convent/ Higher Primary School
 Jasmeen Convent/ Higher Primary School
 Davanagere Convent/ Higher Primary School
 Gnanaganga High School
 M D R School, Madalaghatta, Hoovina Hadagali Taluka
 K. N. Higher Primary School, Madagatta Circle
 M. D. M. R. School, Giriyapura mata, Hoovina Hadagali Taluka

Major cultivation
Hadagali Mallige(ಹಡಗಲಿ ಮಲ್ಲಿಗೆ) (Jasminum auriculatum) is one of the top three cultivars of Jasmine endemic to Karnataka, grown mainly in Huvina Hadagali and surrounding  in Bellary district of Karnataka.  The other two varieties being Mysooru Mallige (Jasminum sambac) and Udupi Mallige (Jasminum grandiflorum). And Paddy is also become the 2nd major commercial crop. Huvina hadagali is to be considered cultural hub of Bellary region as many of the stage artist are nurtured under ex home minister of Karnataka Mr M P Prakash.
Founded the cultural institution called "RANGABHARATHI"

Notable people
 C. R. Rao, a centurion (100+ years old), was born in Hoovina Hadagali.
 M. P. Prakash, lawyer and ex Home Minister, was born in Hoovina Hadagali.

Tourist places
 Honnur Basavanna Temple (new)
 Kalleshwara Temple (Sogi - 10 km.)
 Panduranga Temple
 Kalleshwara Temple, Hire Hadagali (20 km.)
 Bettadamalleshwara Temple (20 km.)
 Anjaneya Temple, Madalagatta
 Suryanarayan Temple (Hoysala period), Magala
 Huligudda
 Singataluru Dam
 Anjaneya Temple, Madagatta
 Gavimata
 Tungabhadra river

Places to visit
 Singataluru Dam (15 km.)
 Honnur Anjaneya Temple and Tungabhadra River
 Madalagatta Temple Hanuman and river crossing
 Navali on the banks of Tungabhadra River
 Magala on the banks of Tungabhadra River
 Hire Hadagali Kalleshwara Temple and Mutt (14 km.)
 Mailaralingeshwara Temple and Mailara Bridge (36 km.)
 Kuruvatti Basaveshwara Temple of Kuruvatti, built by Jakanacharya (41 km.)
 Sri Channaveereshwara Matha of Sri Ma Ni Pra Channaveerashivayogigalu of Jangamakshetra, Linganayakanahalli (51 km.)

References

External links

 http://wikimapia.org/10727399/RANGA-BHARATHI-DRAMA-THEATER

Cities and towns in Vijayanagara district